Indiana Flooring were a New York City soccer team that played in the American Soccer League between 1924 and 1927. They replaced New York Field Club. Before joining the ASL, the team had played in various state leagues.

Ernest Viberg, a former trainer who acted as an interpreter for Bethlehem Steel when they toured Sweden in 1919, initially took control of the franchise.

However, in 1927 it was bought by Charles Stoneham, owner of the New York Giants baseball team.

In subsequent seasons they played as the New York Nationals and then as the New York Giants.

Year-by-year

Notable coaches
   Robert Millar 1925–1927

Notable former players

References

Men's soccer clubs in New York (state)
Defunct soccer clubs in New York City
American Soccer League (1921–1933) teams
New York Nationals (ASL)
1927 disestablishments in New York (state)
Association football clubs disestablished in 1927